Khodaldham is a Hindu temple complex dedicated to Khodal, a patron deity of Leuva Patel community, located in Kagvad in Rajkot district, Gujarat, India. The temple was opened in 2017.

History 

The temple was constructed by Shree Khodaldham Trust, an organisation of Leuva Patel community from Rajkot. The temple construction started in 2012 with laying of the foundation stone. It was inaugurated on 21 January 2017. The inauguration ceremony was attended by more than 3,00,0000 people.

Architecture 

The temple is built in Mahameru Prasad design of Maru-Gurjara architecture. It is 289 ft 7 inch long, 253 ft wide and 159 ft 1 inch high. The height of the temple is kept 10 feet lower than the Somnath temple to respect its supremacy. The primary plinth (jagati) of the temple is 18 feet high and the secondary plinth is 6 feet 5 inch high. The kalasha on the top of the temple is gold plated and 14 feet tall and weigh 6 ton. The flag mast is 40 feet high. About 650 statues adorning the exterior of the temple are chiseled by artisans from Odisha. The pillars, beams, toranas and roofs are carved by artisans from Rajasthan. The carvings include the 72 scenes from epics Mahabharata and Ramayana. About 230000 cubic feet of Bansi Paharpur pink stone is used for the construction.

The central deity of the temple is Khodal, also known as Khodiyar. Other twenty deities installed in the temple are Ganesha, Hanuman, Ram-Sita, Radha-Krishna as well as other goddesses such as Amba, Annapurna, Ashapura, Bahuchar, Butbhavani, Brahmani, Chamunda, Gatral, Gel, Harsiddhi, Mahakali, Momai, Nagbai, Randal, Sihori and Verai.

Gallery

References

External link 
 

Hindu temples in Gujarat
Rajkot district
Māru-Gurjara architecture
Buildings and structures completed in 2017
21st-century Hindu temples
Tourist attractions in Rajkot district